Maersk Air was a Danish airline which operated between 1970 and 2005. Owned by the eponymous A. P. Møller–Mærsk Group, it operated a combination of domestic and international scheduled flights, and charter flights. It included a helicopter and corporate jet division and had three wholly owned subsidiaries: Maersk Commuter, Maersk Air UK and Star Air. Combined, they operated 193 aircraft of 26 models. This included eleven models from Boeing, four models from Bombardier, two each from Hawker Siddeley, Fokker and Eurocopter. The most popular aircraft was the Boeing 737, of which the airline operated 78 airframes of five variants. Four aircraft have been involved in hull-lost accidents.

Maersk Air was established upon the take-over of Falck Air. It commenced operations using de Havilland Heron, Hawker Siddeley HS 748 and Fokker F27 Friendship regional airliners. After entering the inclusive tours market, five Boeing 720s became the airline's first jetliners. The 737-200 was introduced in 1976, but proved too small for many domestic routes. This caused Maersk to introduce the de Havilland Canada Dash 7 in 1981, replaced by the Fokker 50 from 1988. The fleet of 737 Classics was introduced from 1985 and from 1998 the 737 Next Generation. The Fokkers were replaced by Bombardier CRJ200s from 1998. Maersk Air was sold to Sterling Airlines in 2005 and ceased operations.

Throughout its history it also operated a corporate jet for the Maersk Group, which have successively consisted of three Hawker Siddeley HS 125 and two Bombardier Challenger 600. The Helicopter division was based at Esbjerg Airport and flew offshore transport for Maersk Oil to oil platforms. It various operated Bell 212, Eurocopter AS332 Super Pumas and Eurocopter AS365 Dauphin 2. Maersk Commuter operated an Embraer EMB 110 Bandeirante and two Short 360. Star Air operated an all-cargo fleet variously consisting of the F27, Boeing 727, 757 and finally the 767. The UK division operated the BAC One-Eleven, the 737-500 and later the CRJ.

The airline was an active investor in aircraft, and a significant portion of the fleet was at any time dry-leased to other operators. Maersk commonly bought new models, achieving good prices and retained them often for only five years before selling them again. Half of Maersk Air's accumulative profits came from the sale of used aircraft. Inspired form the importance of crucial timing of purchase and sale of ships, Maersk Air made several advantages deals. One of the involved selling 737-200s for a higher price than they had paid for them.

Livery

From the onset Maersk Air use the Maersk Group's visual profile. This consisted of the fuselage covered in a sky blue paint scheme, with a dark blue cheatline down the side. The airline used the group's logo, consisting of a white heptagram star on sky blue background. The star appeared on the front sides of the fuselage and on the vertical stabilizer.

Due to the franchise agreement with British Airways, Maersk Air UK applied the British corporation's livery to its UK fleet. This originally consisted of the "Landor" scheme and later the ethnic liveries. Similarly, due to its aircraft solely being employed by United Parcel Service, Star Air had its 727s and 757s painted in UPS Airlines' livery. As the original batch of aircraft came from UPS, this had the added advantage of the aircraft not having to be repainted.

Maersk Air's theme was changed in 2004, when the "fly as you like" program was introduced. The bodies were instead painted in sections of three colors, white, dark blue and light blue, respectively. The Maersk star was removed from the tail and replaced with a wordmark. A similar scheme was adopted by Star Air with the delivery of their 767s. These also carry the "Maersk" wordmark on the vertical stabilizer.

Aircraft
The following is a list of aircraft operated by Maersk Air and its subsidiaries. This includes aircraft operated by Maersk Commuter, Maersk Air UK, Star Air and Maersk Air's helicopter division and corporate jets. It excludes aircraft operated by partially owned subsidiaries, including Birmingham European Airways, Brymon Airways, Brymon European Airways and Estonian Air.

The list consists of the total number of aircraft operated by the airline (although the peak number operated may be lower), the year the type was first introduced, the year the last aircraft was taken out of service, and a description of the aircraft's use.

Specific references

General references
 
 
 

Aircraft
Maersk Air